Fred Robinson may refer to:

Sports

Association football (soccer)
 Fred Robinson (footballer, born 1881) (1881–?), English footballer for Grimsby Town
 Fred Robinson (footballer, born 1884) (1884–1971), Australian rules footballer for Essendon
 Fred Robinson (footballer, born 1939) (1939–2000), Australian rules footballer for North Melbourne & Brunswick
 Fred Robinson (footballer, born 1954), English footballer for Doncaster Rovers and Huddersfield Town

Other sports
 Fred Robinson (baseball) (1856–1933), American baseball second baseman
 Fred Robinson (rugby league) (fl. 1930s–1940s), Australian rugby player
 Fred Robinson (Canadian football) (born 1930), Canadian football player
 Fred Robinson (American football) (born 1961), American football linebacker

Others
 Fred Norris Robinson (1871–1966), American Celticist and scholar of Geoffrey Chaucer
 Fred Robinson (musician) (1901–1984), American trombonist
 Fred Shuttlesworth (born Fred Lee Robinson, 1922–2011), American civil rights activist
 Fred C. Robinson (1930–2016), American academic
 Abu Talib (musician) (born Fred Leroy Robinson, 1939–2009), American blues and jazz musician
 Fred D. Robinson Jr. (fl. 1976–2009), U.S. Army general; recipient of several service medals

See also
Frederick Robinson (disambiguation)